S3 Texture Compression (S3TC) (sometimes also called DXTn, DXTC, or BCn) is a group of related lossy texture compression algorithms originally developed by Iourcha et al. of S3 Graphics, Ltd. for use in their Savage 3D computer graphics accelerator. The method of compression is strikingly similar to the previously published Color Cell Compression, which is in turn an adaptation of Block Truncation Coding published in the late 1970s. Unlike some image compression algorithms (e.g. JPEG), S3TC's fixed-rate data compression coupled with the single memory access (cf. Color Cell Compression and some VQ-based schemes) made it well-suited for use in compressing textures in hardware-accelerated 3D computer graphics. Its subsequent inclusion in Microsoft's DirectX 6.0 and OpenGL 1.3 (via the GL_EXT_texture_compression_s3tc extension) led to widespread adoption of the technology among hardware and software makers. While S3 Graphics is no longer a competitor in the graphics accelerator market, license fees have been levied and collected for the use of S3TC technology until October 2017, for example in game consoles and graphics cards. The wide use of S3TC has led to a de facto requirement for OpenGL drivers to support it, but the patent-encumbered status of S3TC presented a major obstacle to open source implementations, while implementation approaches which tried to avoid the patented parts existed.

Patent 
Some (e.g. US 5956431 A) of the multiple USPTO patents on S3 Texture Compression expired on October 2, 2017. At least one continuation patent, US6,775,417, however had a 165-day extension. This continuation patent expired on March 16, 2018.

Codecs 
There are five variations of the S3TC algorithm (named DXT1 through DXT5, referring to the FourCC code assigned by Microsoft to each format), each designed for specific types of image data. All convert a 4×4 block of pixels to a 64-bit or 128-bit quantity, resulting in compression ratios of 6:1 with 24-bit RGB input data or 4:1 with 32-bit RGBA input data. S3TC is a lossy compression algorithm, resulting in image quality degradation, an effect which is minimized by the ability to increase texture resolutions while maintaining the same memory requirements. Hand-drawn cartoon-like images do not compress well, nor do normal map data, both of which usually generate artifacts. ATI's 3Dc compression algorithm is a modification of DXT5 designed to overcome S3TC's shortcomings with regard to normal maps.  id Software worked around the normalmap compression issues in Doom 3 by moving the red component into the alpha channel before compression and moving it back during rendering in the pixel shader.

Like many modern image compression algorithms, S3TC only specifies the method used to decompress images, allowing implementers to design the compression algorithm to suit their specific needs, although the patent still covers compression algorithms. The nVidia GeForce 256 through to GeForce 4 cards also used 16-bit interpolation to render DXT1 textures, which resulted in banding when unpacking textures with color gradients. Again, this created an unfavorable impression of texture compression, not related to the fundamentals of the codec itself.

DXT1 

This mode operates similarly to mode 0xC0 of the original Apple Video codec.

This color sometimes causes a black border surrounding the transparent area when linear texture filtering and alpha test is used, due to colors being interpolated between the color of opaque texel and neighbouring black transparent texel.

DXT2 and DXT3 

In DXT2, the color data is interpreted as being premultiplied by alpha, in DXT3 it is interpreted as not having been premultiplied by alpha. Typically DXT2/3 are well suited to images with sharp alpha transitions, between translucent and opaque areas.

DXT4 and DXT5 
DXT4 and DXT5 (collectively also known as Block Compression 3 or BC3) converts 16 input pixels into 128 bits of output, consisting of 64 bits of alpha channel data (two 8-bit alpha values and a 4×4 3-bit lookup table) followed by 64 bits of color data (encoded the same way as DXT1).

DXT4's color data is premultiplied by alpha, whereas DXT5's is not. Because DXT4/5 use an interpolated alpha scheme, they generally produce superior results for alpha (transparency) gradients than DXT2/3.

Further variants

BC4 and BC5 

BC4 and BC5 (Block Compression 4 and 5) are added in Direct3D 10. They reuse the alpha channel encoding found in DXT4/5 (BC3).
 BC4 stores 16 input single-channel (e.g. greyscale) pixels into 64 bits of output, encoded in the same way as BC3 alphas. The expanded palette provides higher quality.
 BC5 stores 16 input double-channel (e.g. tangent space normal map) pixels into 128 bits of output, consisting of two halves each encoded in the same way as BC3 alphas.

BC6H and BC7 
BC6H (sometimes BC6) and BC7 (Block Compression 6H and 7) are added in Direct3D 11.
 BC6H encodes 16 input RGB HDR (float16) pixels into 128 bits of output.
 BC7 encodes 16 input RGB8/RGBA8 pixels into 128 bits of output.

BC6H and BC7 have a much more complex algorithm with a selection of encoding modes. The quality is much better as a result.

S3TC format comparison

See also 
 S2TC, patentless workaround
 FXT1
 DirectDraw Surface
 PVRTC
 Adaptive Scalable Texture Compression (ASTC)
 Ericsson Texture Compression (ETC1 & ETC2)
 Color Cell Compression

References

External links 

 US Patent & Trademark Office, Patent Full Text and Image Database, result for US 5956431 A
USPTO Patent Assignment Search for US 5956431 A
Microsoft Developer Network article on Block Compression in Direct3D 10
squish, an MIT-licensed S3TC compressor. The site also contains an article giving an introduction to compression algorithms.
Comparison between S3TC and FXT1 texture compression
The Truth about S3TC Note: This article used an early S3TC compression engine, not nVidia's or ATI's updated codecs.
(Wayback Machine copy)
Texture compression survey
A fast, SSE2-enabled DXT1/5 compressor by Intel
Betsy, a GPU-accelerated compressor.
Modern open source BC1-7 encoders supporting Rate–distortion optimization (RDO)
DXT Texture Compression with SDL
3D computer graphics
Lossy compression algorithms
Texture compression